Rudiloria trimaculata is a species of millipede in the family Xystodesmidae. It is found in the northeastern United States and southeastern Canada.

Subspecies
These subspecies belong to the species Rudiloria trimaculata:
 Rudiloria trimaculata tortua
 Rudiloria trimaculata trimaculata

References

Further reading

External links

 

Xystodesmidae
Millipedes of North America